Mokosak is a surname. Notable people with the surname include: 

Carl Mokosak (born 1962), Canadian ice hockey player
John Mokosak (born 1963), Canadian ice hockey player, brother of Carl